Pavel Hoftych (born 9 May 1967) is a Czech football manager and former player. He played in the Czech First League for Zlín, scoring once in 63 league matches.

He signed a 2-year contract with Spartak Trnava in summer 2011, but resigned in November 2012.

Honours

Managerial
 FC Slovan Liberec
Czech Cup runner-up:  2019–20

References

External links
  Profile on idnes.cz

1967 births
Living people
Czech footballers
Czechoslovak footballers
Czech First League players
FK Hvězda Cheb players
FC Fastav Zlín players
1. FK Příbram players
SK Hanácká Slavia Kroměříž players
Czech football managers
Czech First League managers
FC Fastav Zlín managers
Bohemians 1905 managers
FC Spartak Trnava managers
Slovak Super Liga managers
SK Dynamo České Budějovice managers
FC Slovan Liberec managers
Expatriate football managers in Slovakia
Association football defenders
Sportspeople from Ústí nad Labem
FK Mladá Boleslav managers